The 2023 Altai Krai gubernatorial election will take place on 10 September 2023, on common election day. Incumbent Governor Viktor Tomenko is eligible to run to a second term in office.

Background
Viktor Tomenko, then-Prime Minister of Krasnoyarsk Krai, was appointed Governor of Altai Krai in May 2018, replacing three-term Governor Alexander Karlin. Tomenko won the following gubernatorial election with just 53.61% of the vote, barely above 50% threshold necessary to avoid a second round, over a field of three opponents with a notable absence of a candidate from Communist Party – the largest opposition party in the region. Newly-elected Governor Tomenko also appointed Karlin, his predecessor, to the Federation Council.

In recent years CPRF made significant gains in Altai Krai. After the 2021 Altai Krai Legislative Assembly election CPRF won 24 seats in the Assembly, an increase of 16 seats, while ruling United Russia lost 11 seats and its majority, winning overall 31 mandates in 68–seat legislative body. In the concurrent 2021 Russian legislative election CPRF Krai Committee first secretary Maria Prusakova won in the Rubtsovsk constituency, gaining the seat from United Russia.

Candidates
In Altai Krai candidates for Governor can be nominated only by registered political partiest, self-nomination is not possible. However, candidates are not obliged to be members of the nominating party. Candidate for Governor of Altai Krai should be a Russian citizen and at least 30 years old. Candidates for Governor should not have a foreign citizenship or residence permit. Each candidate in order to be registered is required to collect at least 7% of signatures of members and heads of municipalities (about 504 signatures — the highest municipal filter in Russia). Also gubernatorial candidates present 3 candidacies to the Federation Council and election winner later appoints one of the presented candidates.

Publicly expressed interest
 Yulia Alyoshina (Civic Initiative), former Chairwoman of Civic Initiative regional office (2021–2022), lawyer, transgender activist

Potential
 Anton Artsibashev (CPRF), Member of Altai Krai Legislative Assembly (2021–present)
 Nikolai Bondarenko (CPRF), former Member of Saratov Oblast Duma (2017–2022)
 Pavel Grudinin (CPRF), director of CJSC "Lenin Sovkhoz", 2018 Russian presidential candidate
 Yury Krasilnikov (CPRF), Member of Barnaul City Duma (2022–present)
 Andrey Krivov (CPRF), Member of Altai Krai Legislative Assembly (2021–present)
 Maria Prusakova (CPRF), Member of State Duma (2021–present)
 Viktor Tomenko (United Russia), incumbent Governor of Altai Krai (2018–present)
 Aleksandr Surikov (Communists of Russia), former Ambassador to Belarus (2006–2018), former Governor of Altai Krai (1996–2004)

See also
2023 Russian regional elections

References

Altai Krai
Altai Krai
Politics of Altai Krai